Dejan Jovanovski (born March 26, 1973) is a former Macedonian professional basketball player. He was member of the Macedonia national basketball team.

Achievements
KK Rabotnički
Macedonian First League Champion - 1993-94, 1994–95, 1995–96, 1996–97, 2005–06
Macedonian Basketball Cup Winner - 1994, 2006
KK Gostivar
Macedonian Basketball Cup Winner - 2002
Lugano Tigers
Ligue Nationale de Basket Champion - 2000-2001

Macedonian national team
Dejan Jovanovski was a member of the Macedonian national basketball team. He played on the EuroBasket 1999.

References
Dejan Jovanovski, European Championship for Men (1999), FIBA Europe
Dejan Jovanovski,  Basketball Player Profile, eurobasket.com

1973 births
Living people
Chorale Roanne Basket players
Élan Chalon players
KK MZT Skopje players
KK Rabotnički players
Lugano Tigers players
Macedonian men's basketball players
Oyak Renault basketball players
Peristeri B.C. players
Sportspeople from Skopje
Small forwards
Shooting guards